D49 motorway, formerly Expressway R49 will be an expressway in the Czech Republic. If completed, it will connect D1 highway to the Slovakia's D1 highway via the R6 expressway. It is supposed to replace the planned route of Czech D1 highway to Slovakia, which original direction to Púchov (Slovakia) was diverted and now leads to Ostrava.

Currently no section is completed or under construction. Construction was expected to begin on the first section in 2009.

External links 
Info on ceskedalnice.cz 
Info on dalnice-silnice.cz 

R49
Proposed roads in the Czech Republic